Mobile simulation may refer to:
M-learning or mobile learning, games and simulations for learning on mobile devices
Mobile simulator, computer software that emulates a mobile device